Lake Boraboy, also known as Lake Kocabey, ( or Kocabey Gölü) is a landslide-dammed lake in Amasya Province, Turkey. The lake and its surroundings were declared a nature park in 2014.

The lake is in Taşova ilçe (district) of Amasya Province It is situated to the west of the town Boraboy.

The  lake is situated in the -high, east-west-oriented valley on the Black Sea Mountains. It was formed when the river was blocked by a landslide. The landslide dam was strengthened later with a concrete weir to avoid its split off by flooding.

The lake freezes in the winter time.

Nature park
The lake area was declared a nature park by the Ministry of Environment and Forest in 2014.

On the northern slopes of the nature park, the common tree species are oriental beech (Fagus orientalis), black pine (Pinus nigra), Scots pine (Pinus sylvestris L.), Turkey oak (Quercus cerris) and endemic oak while the vegetation on the southern slopes is mostly diverse shrubs.

The northern bank of the lake is less inclined and provides so place for picnicking. The nature park offers outdoor recreational activities such as hiking, motocross, off-roading, wildlife photography. There are some accommodation facilities of the Ministry of Forestry and the municipality of the town Boraboy.

References

Boraboy
Landforms of Amasya Province
Boraboy
Nature parks in Turkey
Taşova District
Protected areas established in 2014
2014 establishments in Turkey